The 1992 UK Athletics Championships was the national championship in outdoor track and field for the United Kingdom held at Sheffield Hallam UCA Stadium, Sheffield. It was the only time the city hosted the championships. The men's and women's racewalking events were dropped from the programme for this edition. The women's hammer throw was also not contested after featured for the first time in 1991.

It was the sixteenth edition of the competition limited to British athletes only, launched as an alternative to the AAA Championships, which was open to foreign competitors. However, due to the fact that the calibre of national competition remained greater at the AAA event, the UK Championships this year were not considered the principal national championship event by some statisticians, such as the National Union of Track Statisticians (NUTS). Many of the athletes below also competed at the 1992 AAA Championships.

Hammer thrower Paul Head and discus thrower Jackie McKernan each won their fourth straight UK title. Linford Christie (100 m) and Paul Edwards (shot put) made it three consecutive wins. Liz McColgan repeated her victory in the 3000 m. Marcus Adam, the 200 m winner, was the only champion to reach the podium in two events, having also finished third in the 100 m.

The main international track and field competition for the United Kingdom that year was the Olympic Games. The UK 100 m champion Linford Christie took Olympic gold in that event in Barcelona and the UK men's 400 m hurdles champion Kriss Akabusi took an Olympic bronze. Akabusi and the top three in the UK 400 m (Roger Black, Mark Richardson and David Grindley) all shared in a relay Olympic bronze, as did UK women's champions Phylis Smith and Sandra Douglas.

Medal summary

Men

Women

References

UK Athletics Championships
UK Outdoor Championships
Athletics Outdoor
Sports competitions in Sheffield
Athletics competitions in England